Heinrich Friedrich may refer to:

 Adolph Heinrich Friedrich Bartels (19th century), Mayor of Adelaide
 Christian Heinrich Friedrich Peters (1813–1890), German-American astronomer
 Heinrich Christian Friedrich Schumacher (1757–1830), Danish surgeon and botanist
 Heinrich Franz Friedrich Tietze (1880–1964), Austrian mathematician
 Heinrich Friedrich Karl Reichsfreiherr vom und zum Stein (1757–1831), German statesman for the Kingdom of Prussia
 Heinrich Friedrich Otto Abel (1824–1854), German historian
 Heinrich Friedrich Weber (1843–1912), German physicist
 Heinrich Rudolf Hermann Friedrich von Gneist (1816–1895), German jurist and politician
 Johann Heinrich Friedrich Link (1767–1850), German naturalist and botanist

See also

 Frederick Heinrich
 Frederick Henry (disambiguation)
 Friedrich Heinrich
 Henry Frederick (disambiguation)